The State of Katanga, also known as the Republic of Katanga, was a breakaway state that proclaimed its independence from Congo-Léopoldville on 11 July 1960 under Moise Tshombe, leader of the local Confédération des associations tribales du Katanga (CONAKAT) political party. The new Katangese state did not enjoy full support throughout the province and was constantly plagued by ethnic strife in its northernmost region. It was dissolved in 1963 following an invasion by United Nations Operation in the Congo (ONUC) forces, and reintegrated with the rest of the country as Katanga Province.

The Katangese secession was carried out with the support of Union Minière du Haut Katanga, a mining company with concession rights in the region, and a large contingent of Belgian military advisers. An army the government called the Katanga Gendarmerie, raised by the Tshombe government, was initially organised and trained by Belgium's military and consisted of Belgian soldiers as well as mercenaries from Northern Rhodesia and elsewhere. There was a similarly organized Katangese Air Force. 

Although the rebellion was conceived as an opposition to Patrice Lumumba's central government, it continued even after the democratically elected prime minister was violently overthrown, leading to Lumumba's own kidnap and murder inside the breakaway state. After Operation Grandslam, the rebels either scattered or surrendered to United Nations forces in 1963.

Congo Crisis

The initial secession

In 1906, the Union Minière du Haut-Katanga (UMHK) company was founded and was granted the exclusive rights to mine copper in Katanga. The principal shareholders in the Union Minière du Haut-Katanga were Comité Spécial du Katanga, the Société Générale de Belgique and the British Tanganyika Concessions. In turn, the largest shareholder in the Comité Spécial de Katanga was the Belgian state. As 33.7% of the revenue of the Congo came from the sale of the copper mined in Katanga, ownership of the company was an important consideration for the leaders of the Congolese Independence movement while the Belgian government was most reluctant to give up its share in the UMHK, and did not finally do so until 1967. In January 1959, it was announced that Belgium would grant independence to the Congo in June 1960. Starting in March 1960, the UMHK began to financially support CONAKAT and bribed the party leader, Moïse Tshombe, into advocating policies that were favorable to the company.

When the Belgian Congo received independence from Belgium on 30 June 1960, it was already wracked by ethnic factionalism and political tension. A coalition of CONAKAT politicians and Belgian settlers had made an attempt shortly before that date to issue their own declaration of independence in Katanga, but the Belgian government opposed their plans. CONAKAT was especially concerned that the emerging Congolese government under prime minister Patrice Lumumba would dismiss its members from their positions in the Katangese provincial government and replace them with his supporters.

On the evening of 11 July, CONAKAT leader Moïse Tshombe, accusing the central government of communist leanings and dictatorial rule, announced that Katanga was seceding from the Congo. To assist him, the UMHK gave Tshombe an advance of 1,250 million Belgian francs  (approximately 25 million US dollars in 1960 – $ today). Tshombe's first act was to ask the Belgian Prime Minister, Gaston Eyskens, for help.  When the newly appointed commander of the Élisabethville military garrison arrived in the city, Katangese authorities immediately detained and expelled him. He flew to Luluabourg and informed Lumumba and President Joseph Kasa-Vubu of the secession. The two decided to fly to Katanga to examine the situation themselves. Katangese Minister of Interior Godefroid Munongo denied them permission to land at the airport and radioed that while Kasa-Vubu could visit Katanga if he wished, Lumumba was not allowed to enter the territory. Infuriated, the President and Prime Minister returned to Luluabourg. Tshombe immediately appointed his own commander, a Colonel Norbert Muke of the Force Publique, to form a new military force, the Katanga Gendarmerie. The gendarmerie was staffed with Belgian officers who were, in effect, seconded to Tshombe as military advisers. On 16 July 1960, Eyskens extended de facto recognition to Katanga and on 22 July created the Mission Technique Belge (Mistebel) to assist Katanga with arms and advisers.

Tshombe and CONAKAT argued that the secession was the result of indigenous nationalist sentiment. However, the Baluba population of the northern districts of the province were actively opposed to independence, and even the population in the south, while generally more sympathetic to Tshombe, was never directly consulted on the matter. Katanga was also home to a disproportionately large white community of Belgian descent, as well as many Belgian expatriates who had invested heavily in the province. For the most part, Katanga's white residents openly backed the secession. Unlike Lumumba, Tshombe had openly courted them, likely because he believed they possessed much needed technical skills, and their exodus would prove catastrophic to the Katangese economy.

Within the Belgian government, King Baudouin was very supportive of Katanga and used all the power of the court to pressure the government into extending diplomatic recognition to Katanga. The Foreign Minister, Pierre Wigny, knowing that the United States was opposed to breaking up the Congo, was against recognizing Katanga. Wigny feared a repeat of the Suez crisis of 1956 when Britain, France and Israel were all humiliated when the United States opposed their attack on Egypt with the Congo playing the role of Egypt and Belgium the role of the nations that attacked Egypt. For the same reasons, the Belgian representative at NATO, André de Staercke, was opposed to a venture that was likely to anger the United States. Henri Crener, the Belgian consul in Élisabethville, was a fierce supporter of Katanga. Harold Charles d'Aspremont Lynden, the right-hand man to Eyskens and his most influential adviser, was likewise an adamant supporter of Katanga, seeing a chance for Belgium to hold onto the most valuable part of the Congo. Between the pressure from his Foreign Minister to not recognize Katanga vs. the pressure from the King to recognize Katanga, Eyskens was left torn and confused. Though unwilling to recognize Katanga out of the fear of the American reaction, the prime minister did accede to pressure from Baudouin and d'Aspremont Lynden to support Katanga.

Within a week of Katanga's unilateral declaration of independence, Lumumba sent a telegram to the Secretary-General of the UN, insisting that something be done about "Belgium's military aggression" in his country and its overt backing of Katangese secession. Lumumba requested "urgent military assistance" due to his government's inability to maintain order in the massive country. Among UN member states, sentiments towards Katanga were generally mixed. Britain and France remained neutral, the latter quietly hostile towards the very idea of peacekeeping in Congo. The British initially provided general assistance to the UN troops who were eventually dispatched, but refused to cooperate with subsequent efforts to deal with Tshombe's rebellious regime. Portugal and the Union of South Africa were openly hostile towards the operation from its conception, and maintained consistent opposition against any interference with the Katanga state.

Gérard-Libois writes: '..during the entire month of August, a ..race against the clock took place with the objective of building a more or less efficient Katangese gendarmery before the eventual withdrawal of the Belgian troops. The commander of the new gendarmery, Major Crèvecoeur, called for former officers of the Force Publique who had left the Congo after the July troubles or were in Katanga.' The numbers of the new force were originally fixed at 1,500 volunteers from 16 to 21 years of age recruited from 'safe' ethnic groups. Almost all the aircraft of the Force Publique had been transferred to Kamina, then requisitioned by Katanga.

Deployment of United Nations troops
On 14 July 1960, in response to requests by Prime Minister Lumumba, the UN Security Council adopted Resolution 143. This called upon Belgium to remove its military personnel from the Congo and for the UN to provide 'military assistance' to the Congolese forces to allow them 'to meet fully their tasks'. Lumumba demanded that Belgium remove its troops immediately, threatening to seek help from the Soviet Union if they did not leave within two days. The UN reacted quickly and established United Nations Operation in the Congo (ONUC). The first UN troops arrived the next day, but there was instant disagreement between Lumumba and the UN over the new force's mandate. Because the Congolese army had been in disarray, Lumumba wanted to use the UN peacekeepers to subdue Katanga by force. Referring to the resolution, Lumumba wrote to UN Secretary-General Dag Hammarskjöld, ‘From these texts it is clear that, contrary to your personal interpretation, the UN force may be used to subdue the rebel government of Katanga.’ ONUC refused. To Hammarskjöld, the secession of Katanga was an internal Congolese matter and the UN was forbidden to intervene by Article 2 of the United Nations Charter.

Disagreements over what the UN force could and could not do continued throughout its deployment despite the passage of two further Security Council resolutions. Passed on 22 July, Security Council Resolution 145 affirmed that Congo should be a unitary state and strengthened the call for Belgium to withdraw its forces. On 9 August, Security Council Resolution 146 mentioned Katanga for the first time and explicitly allowed UN forces to enter Katanga whilst forbidding their use to 'intervene in or influence the outcome of any internal conflict.' Unhappy with Eyskens's ambivalent policy, King Baudouin tried to replace him at the beginning of August with Paul Van Zeeland with a mandate to recognize Katanga. The King's maneuver failed when the man he designated to serve as Foreign Minister in the new government, Paul-Henri Spaak, declined to take part.

A subject of much controversy was Belgium's involvement with Katanga. Brussels had neither inspired nor engineered Moise Tshombe's scheme of Katangese secession, but provided technical, financial, and military aid in order to keep Katanga stable in terms of public order and domestic security. The Belgians went on to advise the ONUC force against unnecessary interventions against the state, as it would only "risk increasing the confusion." At the same time, Pierre Wigny, the Foreign Minister, informed the United States, France, and Britain that his government was opposed to Tshombe's intrigues and was concerned that long-term separation would compromise Congo's economic vitality. The government of Katanga had attached to it 1,133 Belgian technicians in charge of the civil service, 114 Belgian Army officers and 117 Belgian Army NCOs commanding the Force Publique and 58 Belgian civil servants in charge of the ministries. Between 4–8 August 1960, Pierre Kauch of the National Bank of Belgium visited Katanga on behalf of the Belgian government with the aim of establishing a central bank for Katanga. Upon his return to Brussels, Kauch reported that Katanga was close to chaos and everything would depend upon the "watchfulness" of d'Aspremont Lynden, who had taken charge of relations with Katanga. Although most of Belgium's military personnel were withdrawn from Katanga in September 1960, over two hundred stayed on, making horizontal career shifts into roles as paid mercenaries serving with the nation's Gendarmes. As late as 1963, several of these soldiers of fortune were still at large, having shed their military uniforms for civilian dress. Other notable Belgian nationals who stayed on included political advisers and some diplomatic ministers. Upon the arrival of United Nations forces in the Congo, they were opposed to allowing ONUC freedom of movement in Katanga and insisted upon obstructing the peacekeeping effort. This view was generally strengthened with President Tshombe himself as time advanced, especially with increasingly vocal demands from Léopoldville that the UN use their military advantage to forcibly remove his regime from power. The Security Council, however, only reaffirmed that the ONUC would not be party to any internal disputes but would enter Katanga to assist with keeping the peace. The first such personnel, largely Swedish forces, entered Élisabethville, the Katangese capital city, on 12 August 1960.

All of this only frustrated the Congolese government, which, on 27 August, launched a poorly organized, ill-fated, incursion into Katanga with Armée Nationale Congolaise soldiers trucked into the province on a motley assortment of Soviet military vehicles. This incident would only lead to the further deterioration of relations between the two governments; sporadic clashes would continue for the next two years. On 8 November, an Irish Army platoon, sent to repair a bridge in Niemba, was ambushed and nine of its men killed by Baluba tribesmen.

Foreign Relations
On 3 October 1960, Katanga opened up an unrecognized diplomatic mission in New York with the aim of lobbying both for the recognition by the United States and to gain admission to the United Nations. The head of the mission was Michel Struelens, an "urbane and soft-spoken" Belgian who had previously been in charge of promoting tourism to Belgian Congo. As the United States did not have diplomatic relations with Katanga, Struelens traveled to New York from Brussels on a Belgian passport. The fact that Katanga was represented by a white man from Belgium was often used to attack Katanga as a sham. Struelens told a journalist that his mission was "to tell the Katanga story in the Western Hemisphere, based on the belief that Katanga is the only barrier against communist influence in the Congo".

Though the United States refused to recognize Katanga, Struelens was able to persuade much of the American right to support Katanga. One of Struelens's allies were the ultra-right-wing Liberty Lobby, which in a pamphlet declared:  "Each new demand, no matter how extreme, has been fulfilled by the groggy demoralized Western nations. From 'infant independence' to gold-plated Cadillacs, every squeak of the Negro wheel has brought forth a new application of golden 'grease' in the effort to appease the unappeasable black revolution". Like other nationalists in the Third World who had experienced European imperialism and racism, African nationalists tended to be somewhat anti-Western in the 1950s–1960s, making the cause of African nationalism very suspect to rightists in the West, and as such Katanga which was dominated by the Belgians was seen as an example of the right sort of an African state. The conservative American intellectual James Burnham wrote in a column praising Katanga that what African nationalists want was "to destroy the power and privileges of the white men; to take over their property, or most of it; and to permit white men to remain only as servants and handmaids".  Within liberal circles, Katanga was widely compared to Manchukuo, an ostensibly independent nation established in 1931 and ruled by the Emperor Puyi that was in fact a sham, a Japanese colony that masqueraded as a real country. Just as Puyi was the supposed ruler of Manchukuo with real power exercised by Japanese officials, it was noted that in case of Katanga the leader was  Tshombe, but the real power was exercised by  Belgian officials.  

Another mission was opened in December 1960 in Paris by Dominique Diur. It mostly functioned as a recruitment office for foreign mercenaries, although such activities were illegal in France. A considerable amount of French mercenaries were recruited to fight in Katanga, including Roger Faulques, Roger Trinquier, and Edgard Tupët-Thomé.

In Brussels, a mission was headed by Jacques Masangu. Just like the Paris mission, it recruited mercenaries to go fight for the Katangese cause.

Further conflicts

Only shortly afterwards, Patrice Lumumba was replaced in a coup d'état by Joseph Mobutu. On 17 January 1961 Mobutu sent Lumumba to Élisabethville where he was tortured and executed shortly after arrival. Already on 18 January, Katangese Secretary of State of Information Lucas Samalenge went to several bars in Élisabethville, telling everyone that Lumumba was murdered, until the police took him away.

The United Nations Security Council met in the wake of Lumumba's death in a highly emotional atmosphere charged with anti-colonial feeling and rhetoric. On 21 February 1961, the Council adopted resolution 161, which authorised 'all appropriate measures' to 'prevent the occurrence of civil war in the Congo, including '... the use of force, if necessary, in the last resort'. This resolution demanded the expulsion from the Congo of all Belgian troops and foreign mercenaries but did not explicitly mandate the UN to conduct offensive operations. However, it was ultimately interpreted by the local UN forces to justify military operations in ending the secession of Katanga. Despite the resolution, during the next six months, the UN undertook no major military operations, concentrating instead on facilitating several rounds of political negotiations. However, many sources on location claimed that UN personnel initiated and maintained a high degree of violence and were both overtly and indirectly responsible for hundreds if not even thousands of civilian deaths.

From late 1960 onwards, Katanga was characterised by a series of clashes between pro-Tshombe loyalists and Baluba tribesmen, whose political leaders were nominally allied to Leopoldville and opposed Katangese secession. Smaller battles were fought against ANC units attacking from other provinces, as well. Sparsely deployed and on many occasions even outgunned by both sides, UN forces had an almost hopeless task of attempting to prevent outright civil war. Anticipating the need for continued ONUC presence in the state, the Security Council authorized an increased presence in Élisabethville. By mid-1961, however, presidential security forces had killed almost 7,000 Balubas. Factional strife also began to engulf the struggling regime. Increased numbers of peacekeepers only enraged the Baluba people, who viewed the United Nations as an unwanted intruder and began attacking both Katangese and UN soldiers with little discrimination.

Mercenary warfare

In February 1961, attempting to bolster his position in Katanga, Moise Tshombe began importing more foreign mercenaries from neighboring states to assist his Gendarmes. The "Mercenary Problem", as the international community termed it, was a major concern of the ONUC. The Katangese Army was already staffed by Belgian officers, and White volunteers of Belgian extraction constituted about 117 men under Tshombe's direction. Although from January to February 1961, gestures were made to remove these 'illegal combatants' from the Congo, their places were quickly taken by a sizable force of nearly 500 British, Rhodesian, French, and South African irregulars. Many of them were given command assignments in the Gendarmes, while others formed a pro-Tshombe unit known as the "International Company", composed chiefly of White South African fighters.

Especially notable among the French mercenaries were professional career soldiers who had fought in the Algerian War. Several were the heads of a para commando training program in Katanga. On March 30, one of the first public reports mentioning large contingents of foreign soldiers claimed that the mercenaries in Katanga included "Belgians, Italians, and 100 South Africans". Serious fighting soon broke out as President Tshombe began to incite both Katangese civilians and White mercenaries to attack UN forces after the ONUC dispatched elements of the nearly 5,000 man-strong 99th Indian Infantry Brigade into the capital. On 5 April 1961, the Secretary-General criticised Belgian mercenaries for their service in Katanga and condemned Tshombe for turning the Katangese public against the United Nations Force. Hostilities broke out again three days later, when Belgian and South African Gendarmes assaulted Kabalo, a Baluba town in northern Katanga, and engaged the Ethiopian peacekeepers stationed there. In the battle that followed, at least 30 mercenaries were disarmed and captured. It was not until 30 April that the State of Katanga agreed to cease hostilities against the ONUC.

Later developments

In June, President Tshombe and Foreign Affairs Minister Évariste Kimba were arrested after attending the Coquilhatville Conference of Congo Leaders, the day they were about to board a plane back to their country. Tshombe was held under house arrest and charged with inciting revolt against the Congolese government, the illegal seizure of arms and aircraft, and printing counterfeit money by issuing Katangese currency. Tshombe subsequently signed a pledge to reunite Katanga with the rest of the nation, and was released accordingly. However, by August it was clear he had no intention of implementing this agreement. Tshombe openly declared in a speech that month that he would defend Katanga's rights as a sovereign state and would do everything to maintain this status quo even in the face of all opposition. During Tshombe's absence, posters with his image were put up on the streets of Élisabethville, and a college of three ministers was created to temporarily take over Tshombe's presidency. The triumvirate consisted of two of Katanga's strongmen, Munongo and Minister of Finance Jean-Baptiste Kibwe, and Minister of National Education Joseph Kiwele to ensure the balance between the two leaders.

In August and September, the UN conducted two operations to arrest and repatriate mercenary soldiers and the Belgian political advisers from Katanga by military force, deeming that such foreigners were the backbone behind the regime. The first operation was carried out by Indian UNF troops, who began rounding up mercenaries at 5 am, culminating in the bloodless capture of nearly 400 men. Not a single shot had been fired. Although Belgium's consul in Katanga was ordered to deport the remaining Belgian nationals, including political advisers, he countered that he could only exercise legal authority over those who were official staff affiliated with his nation's government or military.

Altogether, about 300 of those captured were expelled from Congo, although several of the mercenaries later returned. White Katangese especially resented this action by the UN. Tshombe was taken by surprise, and tensions escalated rapidly. On 11 September, the UNF further demanded that all foreigners serving as police officers in Katanga be expelled, but the president did not comply. Any chances of negotiation for the peaceful removal of remaining foreign players was quickly crushed by the revelation that some UN personnel had been planning to aid in a conspiracy to remove Tshombe from power, seize the radio station in Élisabethville, and apprehend his Gendarmes. The Katangese quickly unearthed the plot, and when Tshombe confronted the UN with his charges it was revealed, much to the latter's embarrassment, that these allegations were based on fairly solid evidence. If such an incident had been allowed to take place, it would clearly have been considered a violation of the ONUC's vows to remain neutral in internal issues besides taking proper action to prevent a major conflict. The following day, hostilities reopened after 155 Irish soldiers protecting civilians in Jadotville were surrounded by a superior force of Gendarmes, including many Europeans. Despite suffering several attacks launched by Katanga's mercenary-piloted Air Force in support of the Gendarme unit, the troopers refused to surrender and during the ensuing fighting inflicted heavy casualties on the attacking forces. The outnumbered Irish company was eventually forced to surrender. They were held as prisoners of war for approximately one month.

No longer able to take the increasing violence in Katanga, the ONUC commanders finally agreed to a new plan which would remove the Katangese government from power. It called for UNF troops to apprehend mercenaries, seize post offices and radio stations in Élisabethville, and send a representative from the central Congolese government to take command. This attempt was not at all bloodless and was resisted by the Gendarmes and their mercenary allies. The initial UN initiative to take over the post offices was efficiently repulsed. Later that day, Katangese soldiers launched a coordinated attack on ONUC forces. An eight-day battle was waged in the city, resulting in the deaths of 11 UN personnel. One company of Irish troops, at Jadotville, were captured. Tshombe's army enjoyed unchallenged air power, and the tiny Katangese Air Force carried out successful strafing and bombing runs on UN positions entrenched in Jadotville, Élisabethville, and Kamina.

The dismal failure of the UNF could also be attributed to inferior equipment. While the Gendarmes were armed with automatic rifles, heavy machine guns, mortars, and Greyhound armored cars, the vast majority of UN troopers used antiquated rifles and civilian vehicles plated with only makeshift protection. During the fighting, the Katangese authorities offered a conditional ceasefire, which was immediately rejected by the ONUC. Eventually, it became clear that any objective to depose Moise Tshombe had failed. The British, Belgian, and French governments became especially critical of 'peacekeeping operations' in Congo which would involve such interference in domestic affairs. They called for an immediate ceasefire. The Soviet Union, on the other hand, protested that more force should have been used to subdue Katanga and initiate an immediate reunification with the Mobutu government.

In the course of the limited peace negotiations which ensued, UN Secretary-General Dag Hammarskjöld and 15 others were killed in a plane crash near Ndola, Northern Rhodesia (now Zambia), under questionable circumstances. There is some evidence that suggests the plane was shot down. Hammarskjöld's death set off a succession crisis at the United Nations, as there was no line of succession and the Security Council had to vote on a successor.

Under UN pressure (military attacks), Tshombe later agreed to a three-stage plan from the new acting Secretary General, U Thant, which would have reunited Katanga with Congo. However, this remained an agreement on paper only. The Katangese government insisted that should the plan in full be honored by Leopoldville, Tshombe be entitled to aid in drafting a new Congolese constitution and elect his own representatives to Parliament. However, both sides began to express reservations about the terms less than a week later. The president wished that his agreement should be ratified by his national assembly before it could be considered binding; this misunderstanding quickly led to a collapse in relations with Congolese government of Prime Minister Cyrille Adoula. The frustrated United Nations went on to adopt a new plan, one that called for the adoption of a federal constitution in Congo within thirty days, an end to the illegal Katangese rebellion, the unification of currency, and the sharing of mining revenues on a fifty–fifty split between Katanga and the central government. U Thant, who was the chief architect of this proposal, also demanded that Tshombe unconditionally release all of his political prisoners. Belgium and the United States, hoping that the latter would have a positive role in reforming a unified Congo, endorsed the plan. While Cyrille Adoula immediately accepted this compromise, Moise Tshombe stipulated conditions. A series of discussions hosted by the UN followed although it failed to yield tangible results. Thant, who had become increasingly incensed by what he regarded as the Katangese state stalling for time, imposed economic sanctions. This, however, only succeeded in destroying the last hopes the Secretary-General had for a peaceful integration. On December 19, an exasperated Tshombe withdrew from ongoing negotiations in protest.

The new administration of John F. Kennedy had decided that the Adoula government represented the best hope of stability in the Congo, all more so as Adoula professed to be a firm anti-Communist. As Katanga happened to possess most of the Congo's mineral wealth, it was realized that Adoula government could not economically function if Katanga were allowed to secede, causing Kennedy to come down on the side of Congolese unity. In New York Struelens called a press conference to say: "When the UN says it has committed no atrocities in Katanga, I distribute pictures of atrocities and so give proof of the bloody mess of the UN in Katanga". In response, the Kennedy administration cancelled Struelens's visa with the intention of expelling him, but backed down after Katanga's friends in Congress raised a media uproar. To win the propaganda war, Kennedy commissioned the Undersecretary of State George Ball to make a case to the media that Katanga was unworthy of American support. In a speech that was later published as a pamphlet published by the State Department, Ball argued that the majority of the people in Katanga did not support the Tshombe regime and noting the way that Belgian officials had all the real power in Katanga argued that Katanga  like Manchukuo was an artificial state created as a cloak for imperialism of others.

Final days
As 1962 drew to a close, the United Nations gradually increased its operational strength in Katanga, with Thant considering ever more seriously the option of forcibly ending Tshombe's secession. As UNF forces continued to be harassed by Gendarmerie, the political stalemate rapidly escalated into outright military tension. When the Katangese populace celebrated the anniversary of their independence, for example, UN officials blocked the roads into Élisabethville, fearful of the 2,000-strong "honour guard" that was scheduled to march in upcoming parades. Several thousand civilian residents promptly demonstrated against this unilateral action. Two months later, the local authorities impounded several railroad cars bearing equipment and supplies for use in ONUC operations and a number of Gurkha peacekeepers were wounded by unmarked land mines on the Katangese border.

A subsequent report compiled by the Brookings Institution indicated that the Katangese regime was purchasing new military aircraft and increasing the size of its army, reporting that they now had at their disposal "40,000 troops and Gendarmerie, at least 400 mercenaries and at least 20 planes." These figures were exaggerated. The Secretary-General's office responded by increasing trade sanctions, but several member states, the United Kingdom in particular, continued to oppose the use of embargoes to force a political solution.

On 20 December, the American State Department announced it would be sending a US military mission to Katanga, a move that was severely criticised by white and black Katangese alike. At least a hundred local students, many of them European, subsequently protested at the United States consulate. The Congolese government and the Eastern Bloc also voiced their dissent. But it soon became apparent that Katanga's bid for international recognition was doomed; skyrocketing pressure for direct action, growing American interests, the militant mood of the UNF commanders, and Belgium's pledge to cease supporting a rebel government all suggested that soon the United Nations would take more forceful measures against Moise Tshombe in the near future.

Surrender
On 24 December 1962, United Nations forces and Katangese Gendarmes clashed near a UNF observation post near Élisabethville. A helicopter was subsequently shot down, and President Tshombe expressed regrets over what initially appeared to be a misunderstanding, promising to call off his forces. But by 27 December, the firing on both sides had not ceased; UN officers notified the National Assembly that they would take all necessary action in self-defense unless a ceasefire was observed immediately. Operation Grandslam was launched the following day and peacekeepers marched on Élisabethville to neutralize the Gendarmes.

Within three days, Élisabethville was under UN control. A number of Gendarmes were either captured or forced to withdraw further west. The foreign mercenaries scattered. Fighter aircraft conducted over seventy sorties against the Katangese Air Force; all but two jets were destroyed on the ground. Tshombe escaped his capital but threatened to launch a counteroffensive unless the UNF restrained itself and called off its attack. A truce was observed until January 1, but, in a controversial act of defiance, UN personnel explicitly ignored their orders from New York and assaulted Jadotville. Katangese forces demolished the bridges over the Lufira River to prevent them from proceeding, but the latter was able to cross using debris, despite light resistance and sporadic sniper fire. It was later suggested that this was due to the slow state of communications then plaguing ONUC in Katanga and the Congo at large. The subsequent capture of Jadotville prevented Tshombe's loyalists from making a stand there, as had been feared.

After the fall of Jadotville, several controversial incidents occurred involving UN forces and foreign civilians in Katanga. Two Belgian women in a car were killed at a road checkpoint after being fired upon by its Indian UNF guards. There were other civilian casualties, including two more unidentified Europeans, who died as a result of actions taken by the UNF. Following these incidents, U Thant suspended further military operations while Belgian and British officials opened up discussions with Tshombe and attempted to talk him into capitulating. It became clear that he was running desperately short of time. On 11 January, peacekeepers entered Sakania, near the Rhodesian border. The Katangese Gendarmes had already been routed and failed to pose a serious threat. Remaining mercenaries, mostly Frenchmen and South Africans, were unable to provide any effective leadership. They ignored instructions to follow a "scorched earth" policy and fled the country by way of Angola.

On 15 January, Moise Tshombe conceded defeat and allowed UN officials into Kolwezi on 21 January, his last stronghold. Land mines and demolitions were to be removed, and all armed loyalists directed to surrender their weapons. Tshombe reportedly claimed in a final address to his supporters: "For the last two and a half years you have twice fought heroically against the enemy. Now their superiority has become overwhelming."

Aftermath
The Congolese government took immediate steps to reintegrate Katanga with the rest of the country. Gendarmes were absorbed into the national military, and Joseph Ileo, former Prime Minister, was appointed Resident Minister of the new province. The United Nations provided assistance in reuniting divided economic and administrative divisions. On 29 January, the Secretary-General's office stated that most UN action in the former state would be limited to economics and that a substantially reduced force would be maintained to keep order. Denmark, Ghana, and the Philippines each pledged to dispatch more personnel. U Thant also called for a slow reduction of military presence, in case a second secession was attempted by fanatics or diehards. Although he defended the use of force taken by ONUC in ousting Tshombe, he also commented regarding the final campaign, "For a peace force, even a little fighting is too much, and only a few casualties are too many."

In July 1964, Moise Tshombe returned from exile to become Prime Minister of Congo at the head of a coalition government, succeeding Cyrille Adoula. He was dismissed from his position in October 1965.

Politics

Constitution

The Constitution of Katanga was promulgated August 5, 1960. It consisted of 66 articles and set out the political structure of Katanga and the rights of its citizens.

Executive
The political system of Katanga was significantly different from that established in the Republic of the Congo where executive power was divided between the president as head of state and the prime minister as head of government. Instead Katanga had a purely presidential republic with the President of Katanga being both head of state and head of government. The president headed the Cabinet of Ministers and was also the Commander in Chief of the Katangese military. The president had a four-year renewable term but was not elected by popular vote, but by a two-thirds majority of the deputies of the Katanga parliament – the National Assembly.

Legislature
Legislative power was divided between the president and parliament who both had legislative powers. The National Assembly consisted of 64 deputies (58 of them belonged to CONAKAT). 85% of the seats were directly elected while the other 15% were for representatives of traditional tribal authorities.

The Grand Council acted occasionally as an upper house but did not hold legislative power. It consisted of 20 leading tribal chiefs. The Grand Council had veto powers on key issues including constitutional matters, legal practice, taxation and the functioning and running of the vital mining industry. The veto could be overridden by a two-thirds vote in the National Assembly.

While being nominally a multi-party democracy in reality the state was dominated by the CONAKAT party.

Ministers 
Through the application of the Constitution of Katanga on 4 August 1960, eleven ministers were appointed. Names and positions are taken from the report of the Belgian parliamentary inquiry into the assassination of Lumumba, names of cabinet members are taken from Guy Weber, Le Katanga de Moïse Tshombe, unless otherwise noted. Salomon Tshizand died on 23 May 1961, Joseph Kiwele died on 14 November 1961, and Lucas Samalenge died on 19 November 1961. They were not replaced. Cléophas Mukeba resigned on 22 April 1961, and was replaced by Chrysostome Mwewa, who became Secretary of State of Public Health.

Secretaries of State 
In October 1960, the Secretariats were created, thereby enlarging the Katangese government.

Other appointments 

Furthermore, the Belgian Michel Struelens opened the Katanga Information Services office in New York on 1 October 1960.

Military

Police
The Katangese National Police was the law enforcement and state security of Katanga. The General Commissioner of Police was Pius Sapve and the force was governed by the Ministry of Internal Affairs, headed by Godefroid Munongo.

See also 

 Free Republic of the Congo
 Front for the National Liberation of the Congo
 Siege of Jadotville
 South Kasai, another secessionist government during the same time period

Notes

References

Citations

Sources 

 
 Cruise O'Brien, Conor (1962) To Katanga and Back, London, Hutchinson.
 
 Devlin, L. (2007) Chief of Station, Congo: Fighting the Cold War in a Hot Zone, New York, Public Affairs, .
 Epstein, H. (ed). (1974) Revolt in the Congo, 1960–1964, Armor Books. Essays by various authors.
 Gondola, C.D. (2002) The History of Congo, Greenwood Press, .
 
 Jackson, H.F. (1982), From the Congo to Soweto, U.S. Foreign Policy towards Africa since 1960, New York, McNally & Loftin Publishers, .
 
 Kalb, M.G. (1982), The Congo Cables: The Cold War in Africa – From Eisenhower to Kennedy, New York, Macmillan Publishing Company, .
 Kestergat, J. (1986) Du Congo de Lumumba au Zaïre de Mobutu, Brussels, P. Legrain, .
 Legum, Colin. (1961) Congo Disaster, Penguin Books.
 Lemarchand, René (1964) Political Awakening in the Belgian Congo, University of California Press.
 Mahoney, R.D. (1983) JFK: Ordeal in Africa, New York, Oxford University Press, .
 Meredith, Martin (2005) The State of Africa: A History of Fifty Years Since Independence, The Free Press, .
 
 
 Oliver, Roland & Atmore, Anthony. (1994) Africa since 1800, Cambridge University Press
 Young, Crawford (1965) Politics in the Congo, Princeton University Press

Further reading 
 
 Gérard-Libois, J. (1963) Sécession au Katanga, Brussels, Centre de Recherche et d'Information Socio-Politiques.
 Larmer, Miles and Kennes, Erik (2014) "Rethinking the Katangese Secession" in Journal of Imperial and Commonwealth History, pp. 1–21.
Loffman R.A. (2019) Religion, Class and the Katangese Secession, 1957–1962. In: Church, State and Colonialism in Southeastern Congo, 1890–1962. Cambridge Imperial and Post-Colonial Studies Series. Palgrave Macmillan.
Erik Kennes and Miles Larmer, The Katangese Gendarmes and War in Central Africa: Fighting their Way Home, Bloomington, IN: Indiana University Press, 2016.

External links 
 Constitution of Katanga (HTML) 

 
Former unrecognized countries
1960 establishments in Africa
1963 disestablishments in Africa
Congo Crisis
State
Separatism in the Democratic Republic of the Congo
States and territories established in 1960
States and territories disestablished in 1963
Former republics